Charles Anthony Woods-Scawen DFC (18 February 1918 – 2 September 1940) was a Royal Air Force officer who flew during the Battle of Britain and as such is one of "The Few".

Early life
Woods-Scawen was born on 18 February in Karachi, British India, the son of Philip Neri and Kathleen Florence Woods-Scawen. He and his elder brother Patrick returned to the family home in Farnborough, Hampshire in 1924. He was educated at the Salesian College, Farnborough.

Royal Air Force
Woods-Scawen joined the Royal Air Force on a short service commission in March 1938. He was promoted to the rank of Acting Pilot Officer, posted to No. 6 Flying Training School at RAF Netheravon on 21 May 1938 and joined No. 43 Squadron RAF at RAF Tangmere on 17 December.

Battle of Britain
On 31 May 1940, Woods-Scawn's Hurricane was damaged in combat with Messerschmitt Bf 109s. He returned to Tangmere and made a belly landing. On 1 June he damaged a Bf 109.

On 7 June 1940 Woods-Scawen baled out over France after a combat with an Bf 109 near Dieppe. He landed in German-held territory and had walked twenty miles before falling in with a retreating British column. Evacuated from Cherbourg Naval Base, Woods-Scawen arrived back at Tangmere eight days after he took off.

On 8 August he claimed a Bf 110 destroyed and three Ju 87s probably destroyed ten miles south of the Isle of Wight, but his own aircraft was damaged and he landed back at Tangmere with slight shell splinter wounds in the legs. On 12 August Woods-Scawen damaged a He 111 and on 13 August claimed two Ju 88s destroyed over Petworth but was himself shot down by return fire and baled out, unhurt. His Hurricane crashed and burned out on Northend Farm, Milland, near Midhurst.

Woods-Scawen claimed another He 111 destroyed on 15 August and two Ju 87s on 16 August. On this day Woods-Scawen was shot down by a Bf 109 off the Sussex coast and baled out, slightly injured. His Hurricane crashed near Parkhurst, Isle of Wight. Woods-Scawen claimed a Bf 109 destroyed on 30 August.

On 1 September 1940 Woods-Scawen's brother, Patrick Woods-Scawen, was shot down in combat with Bf 109s in the Kenley area; he bailed out but was killed when his parachute failed. His body was not found until 6 September in the grounds of The Ivies, Kenley Lane.

Woods-Scawen was shot down in combat over Ivychurch with Bf 109s on 2 September 1940 but bailed out too low and was killed. His Hurricane caught fire and crashed at Fryland, near Ivychurch.

Woods-Scawen was awarded the Distinguished Flying Cross. The award was gazetted four days after his death. The citation read:
This officer has taken part in all engagements carried out by his squadron since the commencement of hostilities. He has destroyed a total of six enemy aircraft and serviously damaged several others. In June 1940, Pilot Officer Woods-Scawen was shot down, landing some 25 miles within French territory, but succeed in making his way back to his squadron. In spite of the fact this pilot has been shot down six times, he has continued to fight with unabated courage and enthusiasm, and has shown outstanding qualities as a resourceful and determined leader.

He is buried in Hawkinge Cemetery, Kent.

References

Royal Air Force pilots of World War II
Royal Air Force officers
Royal Air Force personnel killed in World War II
The Few
People educated at Salesian College, Farnborough
Recipients of the Distinguished Flying Cross (United Kingdom)
1918 births
1940 deaths
Aviators killed by being shot down
Aviators killed in aviation accidents or incidents in England
Victims of aviation accidents or incidents in 1940
Military personnel from Karachi
Military personnel of British India